From the Vaults, Vol. 1 is a compilation album by American sludge metal band Kylesa, collecting previously unreleased tracks, alternate versions of released tracks and one new track. It was released on November 16, 2012 in Europe and November 20, 2012 in North America through Season of Mist. The collection features a newly recorded track titled "End Truth" as well as a cover of Pink Floyd's "Set the Controls for the Heart of the Sun" and Buzzoven's "Drained".

Track listing 
 "Intro"
 "Inverse"
 "111 Degree Heat Index"
 "Between Silence and Sound II"
 "Paranoid Tempo"
 "End Truth"
 "Bottom Line II"
 "Wavering"
 "Bass Salts"
 "Drained"
 "Set the Controls for the Heart of the Sun"
 "Drum Jam"

Personnel 
From the Vaults, Vol. 1 album personnel adapted from the CD liner notes.

Kylesa
Phillip Cope – vocals (2–8), guitar (2–8, 10, 11), bass (4, 6, 10), keyboards (4,6), theremin (1)
Laura Pleasants – vocals (2–8, 10, 11), guitar (1, 3-7, 10, 11), keyboards (6)
Carl McGinley – drums (1–12)
Tyler Newberry – percussion (1, 3, 4, 6, 7), keyboards (4)
Eric Hernandez – bass (1, 3, 7, 9), drums (2, 12)
Corey Barhorst – bass (5,8)
Javier Villegas – bass (2)
Jay Matheson – bass (11)

Additional personnel
Philip Cope – producer, assistant engineer
Jay Matheson – head engineer
Steve Slavich – assistant engineer
Zac Thomas – assistant engineer
Dave Harris – mastering at Studio B
Shaun Beaudry – art
Casey McKinley – layout

References

External links 
 
 

2012 albums
Kylesa albums